The first season of the Fox television series Sleepy Hollow premiered on September 16, 2013, and concluded January 20, 2014, consisting of 13 episodes.

Cast and characters

Main cast
 Tom Mison as Ichabod Crane
 Nicole Beharie as Lt. Abigail "Abbie" Mills
 Orlando Jones as Captain Frank Irving
 Katia Winter as Katrina Crane

Recurring cast

 Lyndie Greenwood as Jennifer "Jenny" Mills
 Nicholas Gonzalez as Detective Luke Morales
 John Cho as Officer Andy Brooks
 Richard Cetrone, Jeremy Owens, Craig Branham and Neil Jackson as the Headless Horseman / Abraham Van Brunt
 D. J. Mifflin, George Ketsios, and Derek Mears as Moloch
 Clancy Brown as Sheriff August Corbin
 John Noble as Henry Parrish / Jeremy Crane
 Jill Marie Jones as Cynthia Irving
 Amandla Stenberg as Macey Irving
 Jahnee Wallace as Young Abigail Mills

Guest cast
 Michael Roark as Detective Devon Jones
 Patrick Gorman as Reverend Alfred Knapp
 David Fonteno as Reverend Boland
 Onira Tares as Grace Dixon
 Craig Trow as Lachlan Fredericks
 India Scandrick as Young Jenny Mills
 Braden Fitzgerald as Young Jeremy Crane
 Judd Lormand and Karen Beyer as Ancitif
 Laura Spencer as Caroline

Episodes

Ratings

References

2013 American television seasons
2014 American television seasons